National Route 79 (N79) is a , two-to-four lane national primary road connecting the provinces of Misamis Occidental, Zamboanga del Norte, and Zamboanga Sibugay. It traverses through many municipalities in Zamboanga del Norte and Misamis Occidental.

Route description

Ipil to Liloy 
N79 starts as Ipil–Liloy–Sindangan Road. It traverses to Titay. After reaching the boundary of Zamboanga Sibugay and Zamboanga del Norte, the road is named Liloy–Ipil Road.

Liloy to Sindangan 
N79 continues as Liloy–Ipil Road. After reaching Liloy–Siocon Road (N966), the road is called Sindangan–Liloy Road. After reaching Leon B. Pestigo or Sindangan, the road is called Dipolog–Sindangan–Liloy Road.

Sindangan to Dipolog 
Dipolog–Sindangan–Liloy Road continues until reaching the boundary of Katipunan and Dipolog.

Dipolog to Oroquieta 
After reaching the boundary of Katipunan and Dipolog thus ending Dipolog–Sindangan–Liloy Road, the road becomes Dipolog–Oroquieta Road. In Dapitan, the road goes into a roundabout with Polo–Dapitan Park Road (N961). After reaching the boundary of Zamboanga del Norte and Misamis Occidental, the road is called Oroquieta–Plaridel–Calamba–Sapang Dalaga Road. After reaching the junction of Oroquieta–Calamba Mountain Road (N960), the road is now called Ozamis–Oroquieta Road.

Oroquieta to Ozamis 
Ozamis–Oroquieta Road continues until reaching the three way intersection with Ozamiz–Pagadian Road (N78) and Ozamis Port Road (N958), the road ends as well as N79.

Intersections

References 

Roads in Misamis Occidental
Roads in Zamboanga Sibugay
Roads in Zamboanga del Norte